Aldo Aureggi (6 October 1931 – 21 August 2020) was an Italian fencer. He won a silver medal in the team foil event at the 1960 Summer Olympics.

References

External links 
 
 

1931 births
2020 deaths
Italian male fencers
Olympic fencers of Italy
Fencers at the 1960 Summer Olympics
Olympic silver medalists for Italy
Olympic medalists in fencing
Fencers from Rome
Medalists at the 1960 Summer Olympics